Independence is a ghost town in Custer County, Oklahoma, United States.  It was one of two communities established on the Cheyenne and Arapaho reservations before those reservations were opened to settlement in 1892.  Independence had a post office from October 5, 1892, to July 15, 1922.  At its peak, the community was served by two newspapers, the Independence Herald and Independence Courier.  Ultimately, Independence failed after being bypassed by nearby railroads, and the townsite is now agricultural fields.

References

External links
Independence - Ghost Town
Independence, Oklahoma (ghost town)

Ghost towns in Oklahoma
Geography of Custer County, Oklahoma